Sergio is a 2009 documentary film based on Samantha Power's biography, Sergio: One Man's Fight to Save the World. The film revolves around the story of United Nations diplomat, Sérgio Vieira de Mello, who worked for the UN for more than 34 years and was ultimately killed in the Canal Hotel bombing in Iraq on August 19, 2003. The work includes extensive interviews with William von Zehle, a U.S. Army First Sergeant in 2003, who spent hours trying to rescue de Mello from under a 9m stack of concrete and other debris of the collapsed building.

Sergio premiered at the 2009 Sundance Film Festival, where Karen Schmeer won the Documentary Editing Award.

Festival screenings 
Sundance Film Festival – World Premiere- Park City, UT  2009 Award winner – Best Editing, Documentary Karen Schmeer
True/False Film Festival Columbia, MO 2009
Hot Docs Canadian International Documentary Festival Toronto, Canada 2009
Mountainfilm in Telluride Telluride, CO 2009 Audience Award Winner
Expression En Corto San Miguel de Allende, Mexico 2009
Melbourne International Film Festival Melbourne, Australia 2009
Sarajevo Film Festival Sarajevo, Bosnia and Herzegovina 2009
Zurich Film Festival Zurich, Switzerland 2009
Aspen FILMFEST Aspen, CO 2009 Audience Award Winner, Best Documentary
Internazionale a Ferrarra Italy 2009
BFI 53rd London Film Festival London, UK 2009
Heartland Film Festival Indianapolis, IN 2009 Crystal Heart Award Winner
Bergen International Film Festival Bergen, Norway 2009
Sheffield Doc/Fest, Sheffield, UK 2009
Global Visions Film Festival Edmonton, Canada 2009
IDFA- Amsterdam 2009
Stockholm International Film Festival- Stockholm, Sweden
Dominican Republic International Film Festival
Santo Domingo, Dominican Republic 2009
Palm Springs International Film Festival Palm Springs, CA 2010
Sedona International Film Festival Sedona, AZ 2010 WINNER Director's Choice Award
DOCNZ Auckland/Wellington NZ 2010
Kosmorama Trondheim International Film Festival Trondheim, Norway 2010
Beldocs, International Feature Documentary Film Festival Beograd, Serbia
Norwegian Documentary Volda, Norway 2010

References

External links 
 Official Movie Website
 

2009 films
American documentary films
2009 documentary films
Biographical documentary films
Films about the United Nations
Films directed by Greg Barker
American biographical films
Films produced by John Battsek
2000s English-language films
2000s American films